Ali Ahmed Abdulla is a member of Bahrain's parliament since 2002, representing the Al-Menbar Islamic Society, a Sunni party.

External links
 Al-Menbar official website
 Al Eslah Society (parent organization)

Members of the Council of Representatives (Bahrain)
Bahraini Sunni Muslims
Al-Menbar Islamic Society politicians
Living people
Year of birth missing (living people)
Place of birth missing (living people)